Shelby County Courthouse is a historic courthouse located at Shelbyville, Shelby County, Indiana. It was built in 1936–1937, and is a two- to three-story, rectangular, Art Deco style limestone building. The building features a recessed five bay central section with two-story, fluted Doric order pilasters and bas relief panels.  Also on the property is a contributing 1931 statue of an American Civil War soldier.  The building's construction was funded in part by the Public Works Administration.

It was listed on the National Register of Historic Places in 2011.

References

Public Works Administration in Indiana
County courthouses in Indiana
Courthouses on the National Register of Historic Places in Indiana
Government buildings completed in 1937
Art Deco architecture in Indiana
Buildings and structures in Shelby County, Indiana
National Register of Historic Places in Shelby County, Indiana